The Naperville Independent Film Festival is an annual film festival held in Naperville, Illinois, United States, which features the work of independent filmmakers.  

Actress Karen Black helped open inaugurate the festival in 2008.  In 2009, film critic Roger Ebert presented the award for best student film to Brooke Hanson for her movie Borderless.

Founding
The Naperville Independent Film Festival was founded by Gary Pradel, Daniel Nigg, Edmond Coisson and Glessna Coisson.  Their goal was to help filmmakers improve their film making skills.  The festival features two panels of judges.  One panel assigns awards, the other panel critiques films and provides feedback to the filmmakers on areas such as lighting, writing and directing.  Pradel, chairman of the festival, explains that "usually when you enter a film you either hear that you won or you didn't, but there's no explanation of why. That's what’s going to make us a little bit different."  Says Edmond Coisson, "our mission is for filmmakers to come back next year and to be even more successful."

2008
Actress Karen Black helped open the inaugural Naperville Independent Film Festival on September 24–27, 2008.  Twenty-five films from local and international filmmakers were screened.   Among the award-winners were Hanieh Jodat for Best Actress, Jon Bernthal for Best Actor and Myles Price for Best Director.  Actor Gary Sinise attended. In addition to the films presented, the festival held screenwriting workshops and panels.

2009
The second annual Naperville Independent Film Festival ran from September 19, 2009 to September 26, 2009.  The festival featured 80 movies selected from about 130 submissions by filmmakers from around the world.  Filmmakers competed for 10 awards including best feature film, short subject, animation, foreign language and screenplay.   The 12-person jury consisted primarily of local newspaper critics.

The event began with a Ghostbusters Tribute Bash in honor of the film's 25th anniversary and concluded with an Awards Gala.  Actor Rodney Lee Conover led a panel discussion and Dan Decker ran a workshop on screenwriting.  Musician Jim Peterik,  known for hit songs such as "Hold on Loosely" and "Eye of the Tiger" performed.  Actress Karen Allen from Raiders of the Lost Ark appeared.  A separate competition for children ages 13 and under was held with Naperville Mayor George Pradel presenting awards to the young filmmakers on Family Day.  Film critic Roger Ebert presented the award for best student film to Brooke Hanson for her movie Borderless.

References

External links
 Official Site
 100 independent films, converge in Naperville
 Film festival dream becomes Naperville woman's reality
 Naperville Film Fest focuses on families for a day

Culture of Naperville, Illinois
Film festivals in Illinois
Tourist attractions in DuPage County, Illinois